La Matanza District is one of ten districts of the province Morropón in Peru.

References